Protacanthamoeba is a genus of free-living naked amoebae of the family Acanthamoebidae described in 1981. It has been found in associations with mycobacteria in drinking water networks, along with other Acanthamoebidae genera, likely allowing the replication of both environmental and pathogenic mycobacteria.

Morphology
Members of Protacanthamoeba are characterized by having slender, flexible and sometimes furcate subpseudopodia originated from a broad, hyaline lobose pseudopodium, as well as having centrospheres in its interior, including a plaque-shaped centriole-like body. Their cysts lack preformed pores or opercula.

Taxonomy
Protacanthamoeba contains 3 species:
 Protacanthamoeba bohemica 
 Protacanthamoeba caledonica 
 Protacanthamoeba invadens  (previously Acanthamoeba)

References

Discosea
Amoebozoa genera